Iker Zubizarreta (born 18 May 1962) is a Venezuelan footballer. He competed in the men's tournament at the 1980 Summer Olympics.

He is the grandson of Félix Zubizarreta, a footballer who played for Athletic Bilbao in Spain prior to emigrating to South America following the Spanish Civil War. Due to Iker's Basque name and heritage, Athletic were reported to have considered making an approach to sign him, although the club's policy of using local players does not normally include players of the Basque diaspora raised abroad, and no move materialised.

References

1962 births
Living people
Venezuelan footballers
Venezuela international footballers
Olympic footballers of Venezuela
Footballers at the 1980 Summer Olympics
Place of birth missing (living people)
Association football forwards
Venezuelan people of Basque descent
Venezuelan people of Spanish descent